is the second single by Japanese band Linked Horizon. It was released on July 10, 2013 through Pony Canyon. The single has been certified Platinum by the RIAJ for sales in the band's home country of Japan, with over 250,000 copies sold, peaking at number two on the Oricon chart. Its tracks "Guren no Yumiya" and "Jiyū no Tsubasa" are used as the opening themes of the 2013 anime adaptation of Attack on Titan. "Guren no Yumiya" was a hit, peaking at number one on the Billboard Japan Hot 100 and fourth place on the Billboard World Digital Song Sales, and received a digital download song certification of Double Platinum from the RIAJ for sales of 500,000.

Overview
The CD single includes full versions of the two opening themes to the Attack on Titan anime series, performed by Linked Horizon, the unit formed by Revo for collaboration projects.

Both opening themes contain German lyrics in the choral and vocals.

 / , lit. "Fiery-red Bow and Arrow", played as the opening music to the anime which premiered April 6, 2013, and this television-version opening sequence was digitally released on April 8, 2013. Subsequently, "Guren no Yumiya" became extremely popular, its following extending beyond anime fandom. Before the CD was available, the 90-second television-sized karaoke version of the song hit top of the charts at  service, despite the fact that the lyrics do not flash on screen.

In June 2013, it was announced that another track from Linked Horizon, would begin usage as the second opening theme of the anime.

The single was released July 10, 2013. The title "Jiyū e no Shingeki" means "March to Freedom".

Chart performance
As a digital single, the opening sequence length edit of "Guren no Yumiya" was successful, reaching number 1 on Recochoku and the iTunes Store's daily anime ranking charts and number 2 on Dwango's daily anime ranking charts. On Billboards Hot Animation charts, the TV size edit debuted at number 7.

On the Oricon's Weekly Single Charts, "Jiyū e no Shingeki" reached the number 2 spot, charting for a total of 3 weeks, and reaching number 1 in the Daily Rankings. The Oricon reported that the single sold 129,000 copies in its first week, making it Revo's first-ever release to sell over 100,000 copies in a single week. It is also the second such theme song to sell so many copies within the first week of sales in 2013, following T.M.Revolution and Nana Mizuki's collaboration "Preserved Roses" for Valvrave the Liberator. On the Billboard Japan Hot 100, "Guren no Yumiya" debuted at number 1. It repeated this feat on the Hot Animation chart and remained at the top for two weeks. The single itself hit number 1 on the Japan Hot Single Sales chart. On the iTunes Store, "Guren no Yumiya" and "Jiyū no Tsubasa" held the number 1 and number 2 spots following their release, while only "Guren no Yumiya" topped the Recochoku, Dwango.jp, Music.jp, Mora, and the Amazon MP3 stores. Karaoke company Joysound's June 2013 rankings also show "Guren no Yumiya" at number 1, unseating Golden Bomber's "Memeshikute", which held the top ranking for 9 months.

Kōhaku
At NHK's 64th annual Kōhaku Uta Gassen on New Year's Eve 2013, Linked Horizon performed a  version of "Guren no Yumiya". It was released for digital download on New Year's Day 2014. This version of the song quickly reached the top of the daily charts on Dwango, Amazon MP3, animelo, mora, and Recochoku Anime, while it ranked within the top 5 on Recochoku overall; the original version of the song was also found in the Top 10 of the retailers.

Track listing

Cover version
Dutch symphonic metal band Epica covered the single in English on their second EP Epica vs Attack on Titan Songs.

Personnel
As listed on Pony Canyon's website.
Revo – Vocals (tracks 1-2), lyrics, composition
Mami Yanagi – Vocals (track 3)
Sascha Böckle – Narration
YUKI – Guitar
Atsushi Hasegawa – Bass
Koji Igarashi – Keyboards
Jun-ji – Drums
Mataro Misawa – Percussion
Tomoyuki Asakawa – Harp
Gen Ittetsu – Strings
Hideo Takakuwa – Woodwind Ensemble
Masanori Suzuki – Brass section
Choir Kyo (Ritsuyukai) and Ensemble Otonoha – Chorus
Yoshinori Koba – Choir conductor

Charts

Single

Songs

Certifications

Awards

References

External links
Linked Horizon's official site for Attack on Titan

2013 singles
Attack on Titan
Japanese-language songs
Anime songs
2013 in Japanese music
Billboard Japan Hot 100 number-one singles
2013 songs
Pony Canyon singles